Cromane is a village located in County Kerry, Ireland.

Location
Cromane is located in the centre of Kerry with views of the Dingle Peninsula to the north and the Iveragh Peninsula westwards. 
Cromane is one of the few locations in Kerry where there is a 360-degree view of the Brandon Mountain Range, the Sliabh Mis Mountains and MacGillycuddy's Reeks, home to Ireland's highest mountain Corrán Tuathail.

Industry
Cromane is a traditional salmon fishing village. However, since the mid-20th Century, the village has blossomed into a centre for aquaculture. Ireland's largest natural mussel beds  are located in Castlemaine Harbour. These beds are within easy reach of Cromane's fleet of mussel dredgers. Over the past two decades, Cromane has also grown as a base for growing oysters.

The award-winning Jack's Coastguard Restaurant is located in Cromane's former Coastguard Station that overlooks Castlemaine Harbour. The building that houses the current bar and restaurant was built in 1866 and was turned into a public house in 1961.

Sport

Gaelic football
Cromane has a GAA club called Réalt na Mara (a name shared by the village's Church and primary school). Between 2006 and 2014 two Cromane GAA players, Donnchadh Walsh and Sean O'Sullivan, won senior All-Ireland medals with the Kerry county team. Cromane also has a ladies football team.

Rowing
Cromane has a rowing club, in operation since 1956, that is part of the Kerry Coastal Rowing Association and the Irish Coastal Rowing Federation. One of the most popular races that the club competes in is the traditional Seine boat race featuring crews of 12 oarsmen (two men to an oar) with a cox guiding them. The history of the Seine boat was one of fishing, specifically for mackerel, and fishermen used a seine-net.

Seine boat racing is unique to South Kerry and the Cromane crew traditionally competes against those from Cahersiveen, Kells, Valentia, Portmagee, Ballinskelligs, Caherdaniel, Templenoe, and Sneem, among others.

Every year, during the summer, Cromane hosts its annual regatta that features races for all ages from under-12s up to the adult Seine boat competition.

People
 John McCarthy: an American computer scientist and cognitive scientist. His father came from Cromane. John McCarthy was one of the founders of the discipline of artificial intelligence.
 Donnchadh Walsh: won three All-Ireland medals with the Kerry senior football team. He played inter-county football from 2003 until 2018. 
 Sean O'Sullivan: won four All-Ireland medals with the Kerry senior football team. He played inter-county football from 2002 until 2012.

References

Towns and villages in County Kerry